The second season of Cambodian reality singing competition program Cambodian Idol premiered on 28 August on Hang Meas HDTV. Based on the reality singing competition Pop Idol, the series was created by British television producer Simon Fuller. It is part of an international series.

Idols (franchise)
2016 Cambodian television seasons